An electoral wipeout occurs when a major party receives far fewer votes or seats in a legislature than their position justifies. It is the opposite of a landslide victory; the two frequently go hand in hand.

A use of the phrase generally assumes that the returns were the product of a legitimate election; show elections to fraudulent legislatures regularly produce incredibly strong majorities for the ruling party(s).

Australia 
Between 1901 and 1949, the federal upper house, the Australian Senate, was elected by a system of majoritarian or "winner-take-all" voting. Each state had 3 of its 6 Senators retiring at each half-senate election. Each voter had 3 votes at each election, whether by first-past-the-post (FPTP) 1901-1918, or the alternative vote. It was often the case that the 3 seats all went the same way, leading to lopsided results in the six states such as 36-0 or 3-33. These results brought the parliament into some disrepute.

In 1948, the Single Transferable Vote (STV) was introduced. At the same time, the number of senators per state was increased from 6 to 10, with 5 instead of 3 retiring at each triennial election. The increased number of vacancies per election would have exacerbated the "landslide/wipeout" effect if the old winner-take-all system had been retained. Instead, having more seats increased the degree of proportionality between votes received and seats won by parties.

Since the introduction of STV in the Senate, the parties have generally been evenly balanced, with minor parties and independents holding the balance of power.

In the 2004 election, the government did the nearly impossible and reached 57% of the vote in Queensland after the distribution of preferences under the then-used Group Ticket Voting system.  It thereby obtained a majority in its own right in the senate from July 2005, when the new senators took up their seats. The number of quotas required to win a majority (four) of six seats, at 57% (four-sevenths of the votes), is so high because there are an even number of seats.

In the lower house, FPTP was changed to preferential voting in 1918.

In the 1974 Queensland state election, using single-member electorates and full-preferential voting, the Labor opposition was reduced to a "cricket team" of eleven MPs, against the National Country Party/ Liberal Party Coalition government with 69 seats (and 2 Independents).  Labor recorded an even worse result in the 2012 Queensland state election when it lost office and was reduced to seven seats, with the Liberal National Party of Queensland winning 78, the Katter's Australian Party winning 2 and 2 independents.

In the 2021 Western Australian state election, the WA Liberal opposition was reduced to only two seats against Labor's 53. This made them one of the only instances of one of the major parties having less seats than a third party (the Nationals received 4 seats in the election). This election had already been conceded by the Liberal leader Zak Kirkup before election day, but even Kirkup lost his seat, making him the first major party leader in 88 years in Western Australia to do so.

Barbados 
 In the 2018 Barbadian general election, the governing Democratic Labour Party was reduced from a majority of 16 seats to 0 seats. With the opposition (Barbados Labour Party) picking up all of the DLP's seats to have a 30-0 majority. Under First Past The Post, the DLP had received only 33,985 votes, out of 154,193; compared to the BLP's 111,968 votes.

Canada 
Canadian politics has seen electoral wipeouts at both provincial and federal level.
 The 2018 Ontario general election, the Ontario Liberal Party lost 48 seats; falling from 58 in 2014 to 7 seats.
In the 1993 Canadian federal election the governing Progressive Conservative Party, which had been in office for nearly a decade, was reduced from an overall majority of 156 seats to only two and suffered a 25% drop in their vote.
 In the 2011 Canadian federal election, the Bloc Québécois was reduced from 47 to 4 seats.  
In the 2001 British Columbia general election the governing NDP was reduced from 37 to two seats, with the other 77 being won by the Liberals.
 The 1987 New Brunswick general election saw the ruling Progressive Conservatives lose all 39 of their seats, with the Liberal Party winning every seat in the legislature.
 In the 1987 Ontario general election, 42 years of Progressive Conservative rule ended as the party lost 36 of its 52 seats and fell to third place.
 The 1935 Prince Edward Island general election resulted in the incumbent Conservatives lose all 18 of their seats to the Liberals, who won every seat in the legislature. 
 The Province of Saskatchewan has seen electoral wipeouts on four separate occasions: the 1934 election resulted in the incumbent Conservatives lose all of their seats; the 1944 election saw the governing Liberals reduced to 5 seats from 38; the 1982 election resulted in the incumbent NDP lose 35 of their 44 seats and in 1991 the Conservatives were ousted with a 28-seat drop to 10 seats.

Germany
The use of an electoral threshold in German elections means that sometimes a major party can fail to win seats in the Bundestag or a state parliament, either because their vote share falls below 5% or because the number of directly-elected seats drops below 3. Post-war examples include:

 1957 West German federal election: The All-German Bloc/League of Expellees and Deprived of Rights lost all 27 seats.
 2002 German federal election: The Party of Democratic Socialism went from 36 seats to just 2 (both directly-elected).
 2013 German federal election: The Free Democratic Party lost all 93 seats.

New Zealand
Until it moved to a proportional representation system in 1996, general elections in New Zealand were also prone to the possibility of wipeouts, though these in general involved the likelihood of third parties getting few or no seats rather than one of the two major parties being massively underrepresented. This former circumstance occurred most starkly in the 1981 general election, in which the Social Credit Party gained 20.6% of the vote yet gained only two seats in the 92-seat parliament.

The 1935 general election did, however, see a major party wipeout, and led to the creation of a new major party. In the 1935 election, the Labour Party gained 46.1% of the vote to the United/Reform Coalition's 32.9%, but won 53 seats to the United/Reform's 19. As a result of this election the two coalition parties merged to form the National Party, which remains a major force in current New Zealand politics.

Philippines 
In the Philippines, the House of Representatives (and its predecessors) are, for the most part, elected under first-past-the-post (FPTP) system; in 1998, parallel voting was instituted, where 20% of the seats are contested in a party-list system, with the 80% of the seats still being elected via FPTP. The Senate since 1941 has been elected under multiple non-transferable vote. From 1941 to 1951, voters can vote under general ticket, which can lead to wipeouts for any party that wins the election. In 1978, this was also the electoral system for the Interim Batasang Pambansa (parliament).

1938 Philippine legislative election: The Nacionalista Party won all 98 seats in the National Assembly.
1941 Philippine legislative election: Starting in 1941 and up to the 1971 elections, Congress was bicameral.
1941 Philippine Senate election: The Nacionalista Party won all 24 seats in the Senate.
1941 Philippine House of Representatives election: The Nacionalistas won 95 of 98 seats in the House of Representatives. The 3 other seats were won by independents.
1949 Philippine Senate election: The Liberal Party won all 8 seats disputed in the election. The Nacionalista Party were almost wiped out, only retaining 4 seats.
1951 Philippine Senate election: The Nacionalista Party won all 9 (8 seats in the general election and 1 seat in a special election held concurrently) seats disputed.
1955 Philippine Senate election: The Nacionalista Party won all 9 (8 seats in the general election and 1 seat in a special election held concurrently) seats disputed. The Liberal Party were wiped out in the Senate.
1978 Philippine parliamentary election: The Kilusang Bagong Lipunan won 137 of 166 seats disputed, The primary opposition, Lakas ng Bayan, were wiped out and alleged massive fraud.
2019 Philippine Senate election: The Hugpong ng Pagbabago won 9 seats disputed in the election. The other 3 seats were won by other parties. The primary opposition, Otso Diretso, were wiped out.

Poland 
The chaotic emergence of a democratic political scene following the fall of communism and the often-changing electoral system caused many wipeouts in Polish electoral history:
In the 1993 Polish parliamentary election, Centre Agreement, Liberal Democratic Congress, Peasants' Agreement, Solidarity, Polish Beer-Lovers' Party, Real Politics Union and Party X, which held a total of 158 seats, all failed to pass the newly introduced 5% electoral threshold, losing all seats.
In the 1997 Polish parliamentary election, the Polish People's Party which was part of the ruling coalition won 27 seats, down from 132 in the previous election, while Labour Union failed to pass electoral threshold and lost all 41 seats.
In the 2001 Polish parliamentary election, the ruling Solidarity Electoral Action-Freedom Union coalition failed to enter parliament, losing all 261 seats. Solidarity Electoral Action dissolved soon after, while Freedom Union was succeeded by Democratic Party – demokraci.pl in 2005.
In the 2005 Polish parliamentary election, the ruling Democratic Left Alliance won 55 seats, down from 216 in the previous election and lost all 70 seats in the Senate.
In the 2007 Polish parliamentary election, Self-Defence of the Republic of Poland and League of Polish Families, both part of the ruling coalition, lost all 56 and 34 seats respectively. Both parties never appeared in the Sejm again.
In the 2015 Polish parliamentary election, the United Left lost all 67 seats due to not passing the 8% threshold for electoral coalitions. The coalition reappeared in the Sejm in the 2019 election as The Left.

United Kingdom

General elections
In the 1997 United Kingdom general election, the Conservative Party were wiped out in Scotland and Wales - losing eleven and six seats respectively. The Conservatives failed to pick up a seat in Wales in the 2001 election either. The Conservatives picked up a seat in Scotland in 2001, but they didn't gain any additional MPs until 2017, while their share of the vote remained below 20%.
In the 2005 United Kingdom general election, the Ulster Unionist Party, which had been Northern Ireland's largest party, lost 5 of its 6 seats. Its last seat was lost at the 2010 election, leaving it without representation for the first time since the party was created in 1912.
In the 2015 United Kingdom general election, the Liberal Democrats lost 49 of their 57 seats, and despite taking 8% of the national vote only had 1.2% of the MPs. Both Labour and the Lib Dems were nearly wiped out in Scotland, retaining just one seat each.

Scottish elections
The Scottish Parliament elections uses a version of the Additional member system, meaning that 73 seats are won through First Past the Post constituency votes, and additional seats are added for the regional vote which uses a variation of the D'Hondt method.
In the 2007 Scottish Parliament election, the Socialists lost all of their six seats, with their share of the vote reduced by over 6%.
In the 2011 Scottish Parliament election, Labour lost twenty constituency seats (seven overall), with the Liberal Democrats losing nine (twelve overall). The Lib Dems were left with only two constituency seats, suffering a complete wipeout on the Scottish mainland, leaving only Shetland and Orkney (two of the safest seats in the country) with Lib Dem MSPs.

Welsh elections
The Senedd uses the additional member system.
In the 2021 Senedd election, UKIP lost all seven of their seats, going from 13% of the regional vote to under 2%.

Elsewhere 
 In the 1950 Turkish general election, ruling Republican People's Party went down from 395 to 69 seats, out of 487 and were ousted from government. 
In the 1982 Spanish general election, ruling Union of the Democratic Centre went down from 168 to 11 seats, out of 350, and were ousted from government.
In the 1986 Trinidad and Tobago general election – The ruling People's National Movement led by Prime Minister George Chambers went from 26 to 3 seats, out of 36 seats the House of Representatives with 32% of the popular vote and were ousted from government.
In the 1990 Grenadian general election – The ruling New National Party led by Prime Minister Keith Mitchell went from 14 to 2 seats, out of 15 seats the House of Representatives with 18% of the popular vote and were ousted from government.
In the 1991 Trinidad and Tobago general election – The ruling National Alliance for Reconstruction led by Prime Minister A. N. R. Robinson went from 31 to 2 seats, out of 36 seats the House of Representatives with 25% of the popular vote and were ousted from government.
In the 1998 Belizean general election – The ruling United Democratic Party led by Prime Minister Manuel Esquivel went from 15 to 3 seats, out of 36 seats the House of Representatives with 40% of the popular vote and were ousted from government.
 1993 French legislative election: Ruling Socialist Party went down from 260 to 53 seats out of 577. Socialists were ousted from government and outgoing Prime Minister Pierre Bérégovoy committed suicide after the loss.
 In the 2000 Mongolian legislative election, the Mongolian People's Revolutionary Party overturned a large majority for the Democratic Union, winning 72 out of the 76 seats contested.
 In the 2002 French legislative election, the centre party Union for French Democracy went down from 112 to 29 seats out of 577, with a further decrease to just 3 seats in 2007.
In the 2002 Turkish general election, all three members of the ruling coalition (DSP-MHP-ANAP), lost all of their seats in the parliament due to their failure to meet %10 electoral threshold. DSP went from 136 to 0 seats, MHP went from 129 to 0 seats and ANAP went from 86 to 0. Main opposition party, DYP also went from 85 to 0 seats. 
In the 2008 Belizean general election – The ruling People's United Party led by Prime Minister Said Musa went from 22 to 6 seats, out of 31 seats the House of Representatives with 40% of the popular vote and were ousted from government.
 In the 2011 Irish general election, the ruling Fianna Fáil party suffered the worst defeat in its history, returning only 20 TDs to the Dáil. The party moved from being the largest party in the Republic of Ireland, to third for the first time ever. Since the formation of the first Fianna Fáil government in 1932, until the 2011 election, Fianna Fáil had been in power for 61 of those 79 years and had always been the largest party in the state (regardless of whether it was in power or not). Many factors caused the electoral meltdown, but chief among them was the collapse of the Irish economy. In addition, its coalition partner, the Green Party lost all of its seats.
 In the 2012 Japanese general election, the ruling Democratic Party of Japan went down from 308 to 57 seats out of 480 the House of Representatives with 15% of the popular vote and were ousted from government.
In the 2017 Bahamian general election – The ruling Progressive Liberal Party led by  Prime Minister Perry Christie went from 29 to 4 seats, out of 39 seats the House of Representatives with 39% of the popular vote and were ousted from government.
 In the 2017 French legislative election, the ruling Socialist Party went down from 286 to 45 seats out of 577. Socialists were ousted from government.
In the 2018 Barbadian general election – The ruling Democratic Labour Party led by Prime Minister Freundel Stuart went from 16 to 0 seats, out of 30 seats the House of Assembly with 28% of the popular vote and were ousted from government.
 In the 2019 Spanish general election, the People's Party went from 127 of the 208 directly elected senators to just 54, falling from a comfortable overall majority of 61% of seats to holding just over 27% of the total, despite the fact that the Spanish electoral system for the Senate all but guarantees at least one seat for the runner-up party in 47 of the 50 provinces. Meanwhile, in the Congress of Deputies, the PP lost all their seats in the Basque Country (down from 2) and were reduced to a single one in Catalonia (down from 5).
In the 2020 Belizean general election – The ruling United Democratic Party  led by Deputy Prime Minister Patrick Faber went from 19 to 5 seats, out of 31 seats the House of Representatives with 39% of the popular vote and were ousted from government.
In the 2021 Moroccan general election - The ruling Justice and Development Party went from 125 to 13 seats out of 395 in the House of Representatives and were ousted from power.

References

Elections